Mordella adnexa is a species of beetle in the genus Mordella of the family Mordellidae, which is part of the superfamily Tenebrionoidea. It was discovered in 1970 in Galicia, Spain and Macedonia.

References

Beetles described in 1970
adnexa